Amphisbaena myersi is a species of worm lizard in the family Amphisbaenidae. The species is endemic to Suriname.

Etymology
The specific name, myersi, is in honor of American herpetologist Charles William Myers.

Geographic range
A. myersi is found in Para District, northern Suriname.

Habitat
The preferred habitat of A. myersi is forest.

Reproduction
A. myersi is oviparous.

References

Further reading
Hoogmoed MS (1989). "A new species of Amphisbaena (Amphisbaenia: Amphisbaenidae) from Suriname. – Notes on the herpetofauna of Suriname 11". Uitgaven Natuurwetenschappelijke Studiekring voor Suriname en de Nederlandse Antillen (123): 65–73. (Amphisbaena myersi, new species).
Vanzolini PE (2002). "An aid to the identification of the South American species of Amphisbaena (Squamata, Amphisbaenidae)". Papéis Avulsos de Zoologia, Museu de Zoologia da Universidade de São Paulo 42 (15): 351–362.

myersi
Reptiles described in 1989
Taxa named by Marinus Steven Hoogmoed
Endemic fauna of Suriname
Reptiles of Suriname